Anthaenantia   is a New World genus of plants in the grass family, native to North and South America including the West Indies. The genus name is sometimes spelled Anthenanthia or Anthenantia.

Species 

 Anthaenantia lanata (Kunth) Benth. - from Mexico + Greater Antilles to Uruguay
 Anthaenantia rufa (Elliott) Schult. - southeastern + south-central United States (Texas to North Carolina)
 Anthaenantia villaregalis (McVaugh & R.Guzman) Espejo & López-Ferr. - Jalisco
 Anthaenantia villosa (Michx.) P.Beauv. - southeastern + south-central United States (Texas to North Carolina)

formerly included 

see Axonopus Digitaria Tricholaena

References

Panicoideae
Poaceae genera
Taxa named by Palisot de Beauvois